Xocomil is a water park in Guatemala. It is located in the Retalhuleu Department in the southwest of the country.

It is the largest and most-visited water park in the country. The park covers an area of  77,300 m³ and is themed to a Mayan pyramid.

Amusement parks in Guatemala
Water parks in Guatemala
Water parks
Retalhuleu Department